On Fyre is the first full-length studio album by American garage rock band Lyres. It was released in 1984 by the label Ace of Hearts and reissued in 1998 by Matador Records. It features "Help You Ann," arguably the band's signature song and the best-known song of the 1980s garage revival, which a commentator at KQED radio in San Francisco called "one of the greatest singles ever made."

The album contains several quotes from songs from the 1960s: "Don't Give It Up Now" contains an excerpt of the guitar riff from "Lucifer Sam" by Pink Floyd, and "I'm Telling You Girl" contains an excerpt of the guitar riff from "You Really Got Me" by the Kinks.

The album includes covers of the Kinks' 1965 hit "Tired of Waiting for You" (the title is shortened to simply "Tired of Waiting"), the Kinks song "Love Me Till the Sun Shines," and Pete Best Combo song "The Way I Feel About You."

Critical reception
AllMusic wrote that "while [Jeff] Conolly's Vox Continental organ keeps his 1960s obsessions up-front throughout, the rest of the band is capable of generating a hard-driving groove, and the performances capture what was exciting and soulful about 1960s punk without drowning in a sea of 'retro.'" PopMatters wrote that "the stop-and-start rhythms of 'Soapy' will prove irresistible to just about anyone with a pulse." Trouser Press called the album "simply the [garage-rock] genre’s apotheosis, an articulate explosion of colorful organ playing, surging guitars and precisely inexact singing." The Washington Post wrote that "it's the passion of Connolly's organ-pumping, tambourine-bashing persona that makes The Lyres' variations on three chords sink deeper and ring truer than most rock acts, past or present." It ranked #35 on the Village Voice annual Pazz & Jop poll for 1984.

Track listing
 Don't Give It Up Now – 4:13
 Help You Ann – 2:29
 I Confess – 2:50
 I'm Tellin' You Girl – 1:40
 Love Me Till the Sun Shines – 3:56
 Tired of Waiting – 3:05
 Dolly – 4:17
 Soapy – 3:43
 The Way I Feel About You – 2:42
 Not Like The Other One – 3:18

Personnel
Jeff Conolly – vocals, organ and tambourine
Danny McCormack – guitar
Paul Murphy – drums
Rick Coraccio – bass, background vocals

References

1984 albums